Romney is an unincorporated community in Fayette County in the U.S. state of Pennsylvania.

Unincorporated communities in Pennsylvania
Unincorporated communities in Fayette County, Pennsylvania